John E. Davis may refer to:

 Jack Davis (veteran) (John Edward Davis, 1895–2003), British World War I veteran
 John E. Davis (North Dakota politician) (1913–1990), governor of North Dakota, 1957–1961
 John E. Davis (architect) (1891–1961), American architect and college football player
 John E. Davis (Texas politician) (born 1960), member of the Texas House of Representatives, 1999 to present
 John Edward Davis (Royal Navy officer) (1815–1877)
 J. Elwood Davis (1892–1974) American football player
 John Emmeus Davis (born 1949), scholar, writer, teacher and community organizer

See also
John Davis (disambiguation)